Hirgan may refer to:
 Hirgan, India
 Hirgan, Iran